Travis Creek is a  long 3rd order tributary to the Haw River, in Alamance County, North Carolina.

Course
Travis Creek rises in Guilford County on the divide between Travis Creek and Buffalo Creek.  Travis Creek then flows east into Alamance County to meet the Haw River about 3 miles north of Glen Raven, North Carolina.

Watershed
Travis Creek drains  of area, receives about 46.0 in/year of precipitation, and has a wetness index of 443.11 and is about 36% forested.

See also
List of rivers of North Carolina

References

Rivers of North Carolina
Rivers of Alamance County, North Carolina
Rivers of Guilford County, North Carolina